Gerhard Delling (born 21 April 1959) is a German television presenter and sports journalist.

Life 
Delling was born in Rendsburg. From 1980 to 1985 he studied at University of Kiel. He worked since 1987 as a journalist for German broadcaster ARD. As a sport reporter he worked for ARD at football sport events. He wrote several books on German football. From 2011 to 2014 he was chief moderator of the German television programme Wochenspiegel.

Works 
 Fußball-Deutsch, Deutsch-Fußball – Berlin: Langenscheidt, 2006
 Portugal 2004 – Munich: Südwest, 2004
 50 Jahre Bundesliga – Göttingen: Verl. Die Werkstatt, 2012

Awards 
 2000: Grimme-Preis (together with Günter Netzer)

References

External links

NOZ.de: Ein TV-Dino stirbt, ARD stellt "Wochenspiegel" ein (in German)
Deutsche Nationalbiliothek: Gerhard Delling

German sports journalists
German sports broadcasters
German television reporters and correspondents
20th-century German journalists
21st-century German journalists
University of Kiel alumni
People from Rendsburg
1959 births
Living people
ARD (broadcaster) people
Norddeutscher Rundfunk people